Freya North (born 21 November 1967) is a British writer, active since 1996, and one of the precursors of what would become known as [[chick lit].  Her earlier novels centre on strong female characters and their raunchy exploits, her more recent work is grittier family drama.

Biography
In 1991, she gave up writing her PhD in Art History in order to start writing her first novel, Sally, about a woman embarking on a no-strings erotic affair. Top agent Jonathan Lloyd at Curtis Brown Ltd put the novel into a five-publisher bidding war which resulted in a three-book deal for a six-figure sum. Sally was published in 1996. Chloe followed soon after, and tells of a woman travelling around the four countries of the UK during the four seasons of the year and her various sensual exploits en route. Polly, about a teacher exchange trip between America and England, was published in 1998 and Cat, about a sports journalist covering the Tour de France, in 2000.

Further titles were Fen (2001), set in the art world and Pip, about a female clown (2004). Her seventh novel, Love Rules (2005), about whether one listens to one's head or follows one's heart, was published in 2005. Home Truths, which reunites the McCabe characters from earlier novels Cat, Fen and Pip, was published in 2006.

In 2008, Freya won the Romantic Novel of the Year Award for her ninth novel, Pillow Talk, which reunites childhood sweethearts Petra and Arlonow a sleepwalker and an insomniac. Pillow Talk was set in the North East of England, specifically in Teesside. Secrets, Freya's tenth novel, also set in the North East, was published in 2009. Because the book's setting was the small Victorian resort of Saltburn by the Sea and featured the famous Transporter Bridge in Middlesbrough, the author was subsequently invited to become an Ambassador for the region. The author left London for Hertfordshire and wrote Chances (2011 based loosely on the county town of Hertford) and Rumours (2012 based loosely on the Hertfordshire village of Much Hadham) The Way Back Home (2014) saw a return to Derbyshire for location and featured a woman returning to artists' commune in which she'd spent her childhood. The Turning Point was published in 2015 to critical acclaim, exploring the long distance relationship between to single parents, one who lives in the Coastal Mountains village of Pemberton in British Columbia and one who lives in North Norfolk. Freya founded and ran the Hertford Children's Book Festival (2015-2017) and judged the Costa Book Awards in 2018. After a sabbatical, the author wrote her 15th novel Little Wing during Lockdown. Set across two time frames with the Isle of Harris in the Outer Hebrides as its setting, the novel was published in 2022 and was a Richard & Judy Bookclub pick.

Bibliography

Single novels
 Sally (1996) 
 Chloe (1997)
 Polly (1998)
 Love Rules (2005)
 Pillow Talk (2007)
 Secrets (2009)
 Chances (2011)
 Rumours (2012)
 The Way Back Home (2014)
 The Turning Point  (2015)
 Little Wing  (2022)

McCabe Sisters
 Cat (2000)
 Fen (2001)
  Pip (2004)
  Home Truths (2006)

Stories
 "In and Out" (2000) Short Story published in Girls Night In

References and sources

1967 births
Living people
British chick lit writers
People educated at South Hampstead High School
20th-century English novelists
21st-century British novelists
20th-century English women writers
21st-century English women writers
English women novelists